The West Fire was a wildfire that scorched  of land in Kern County, California. While not one of the largest fires of the 2010 California wildfire season, the West Fire was the most destructive, with 50 structures being destroyed.

References 

2010 California wildfires
Wildfires in Kern County, California